Aurora Cervantes Rodríguez (born 8 January 1953) is a Mexican politician from the Party of the Democratic Revolution. From 2006 to 2009 she served as Deputy of the LX Legislature of the Mexican Congress representing Zacatecas, and previously served in the Congress of Zacatecas.

References

1953 births
Living people
Politicians from Zacatecas
Women members of the Chamber of Deputies (Mexico)
Members of the Congress of Zacatecas
Party of the Democratic Revolution politicians
20th-century Mexican politicians
20th-century Mexican women politicians
21st-century Mexican politicians
21st-century Mexican women politicians
Universidad Autónoma de La Laguna alumni
Deputies of the LX Legislature of Mexico
Members of the Chamber of Deputies (Mexico) for Zacatecas